The Bar (Swedish: Baren) is a reality competition television franchise that originated in Sweden and then Norway in 2000, and was developed in other countries starting from 2001. The premise of the show is that for around two months, a number of contestants work in a bar while attempting to avoid periodic public-vote evictions from a communal house and hence win a cash prize. The show was devised by the Swedish company Strix. The show first aired on TV3 Sweden on 24 April 2000.

Concept

The aim of The Bar is for contestants to remain for as long as possible, with the power to decide who stays or goes in the hands of the viewers. The programme claims to illustrate what happens when strangers live together and attempt to run a city center bar. The Bar is an interactive program where both viewers and internet users are part of the action. More than 25 webcams broadcast 24 hours a day in the bar and the participants’ apartment. Viewers were urged to take decisions affecting the story lines. The bar in the show was real and open to the public, meaning viewers could visit and talk to the contestants.

A series is shown over approximately three months, with a host-led live broadcast at the end of each week. There, the contestants discuss the past six days’ events. Contestants rate each other on their performances. The one with the lowest score becomes one of two nominees who can be voted out by TV viewers during the live elimination show. In addition, the contestant with the highest score gets to choose the second nominee who can be voted out.  

Throughout the live show, a viewer poll is held by phone and via the Web. At the end of the series, after 11 elimination rounds, one winner remains to claim the cash prize.

Rules

Format
 If a Bartender (contestant) neglects their duties, they may be punished by the Bar Manager.
 If a Bartender receives two warnings, they are disqualified from the show.
 Bartenders must not leave the bar whilst on duty without permission.
 There must be at least four bartenders on duty during opening hours.
 Bartenders must not consume any alcohol whilst on duty.
 Bartenders must not lend out money from the till.

Plus/Minus
On Wednesday evenings there is a "Plus/Minus" meeting:
 Each bartender awards a minus to the bartender who they think should be eliminated.
 Each bartender awards a plus to the bartender who they think most deserves to stay.
 Minuses are deducted from pluses. The bartender with the lowest score will be the first person to be nominated for elimination.
 The bartender with the highest score will nominate a second person for elimination.
 The public will decide which of the two nominated bartenders will be eliminated from the show.

International versions
There are currently 20 versions and 45 winners of The Bar format. The most recent winner is Sandi Jug from Slovenia.

Similar shows
These are formats similar to The Bar, but are not licensed Strix productions:
  – Bar Wars
  – Playa Bar TV
  – Guerra de Bares
  – Pláž 33

See also
 List of television show franchises

References

Swedish reality television series
Reality television series franchises

no:Baren